Hall is an unincorporated community in San Saba County, in the U.S. state of Texas. According to the Handbook of Texas, the community had a population of 15 in 2000.

History
Hall was founded in 1903 when settlers purchased land from the local Hall and Selman ranches. The Hall Ranch was established by John Mabin “Pony” Hall in 1855. Settlers in the area included Frank Templeton, Bill Wicker, and a man surnamed Woolsey. A Unity Baptist Church building was erected in 1913. Mr. Templeton opened the first store in Hall in 1906. A post office was established here on September 14, 1911, by William Nathan Hudson in his general store and named it Hall in honor of the Hall family. That same year, the Gulf, Colorado and Santa Fe Railway built a track and a depot here and built cattle pens the following year. Hall had 150 residents, a bank, two general stores, and churches for Christian and Baptist congregations in 1914. The population decreased to 82 in 1925, causing the post office to close in either 1942 or 1943. It went down to 50 in 1986 and farmers grew peanuts and grain crops on their ranches. The population was 15 in 2000.

Geography

Education
Hall had its first school built in 1905. It burned to the ground in 1914 and schoolchildren finished the year at the local Woodmen's lodge. A three-room school building served the community until it joined the Richland Springs Independent School District in 1932.

References

Unincorporated communities in San Saba County, Texas
Unincorporated communities in Texas